In statistics, an ecological correlation (also spatial correlation) is a correlation between two variables that are group means, in contrast to a correlation between two variables that describe individuals. For example, one might study the correlation between physical activity and weight among sixth-grade children. A study at the individual level might make use of 100 children, then measure both physical activity and weight; the correlation between the two variables would be at the individual level. By contrast, another study might make use of 100 classes of sixth-grade students, then measure the mean physical activity and the mean weight of each of the 100 classes. A correlation between these group means would be an example of an ecological correlation.

Because a correlation describes the measured strength of a relationship, correlations at the group level can be much higher than those at the individual level. Thinking both are equal is an example of ecological fallacy.

See also
General topics
 Ecological regression
 Geographic information science
 Spatial autocorrelation
 Complete spatial randomness
 Modifiable areal unit problem
Specific applications
 Spatial epidemiology
 Spatial econometrics

References

Covariance and correlation